The Petit Morin (literally Little Morin) is an  river in France, a left tributary of the Marne. Its source is in the commune Val-des-Marais. Its course crosses the departments of Marne, Aisne and Seine-et-Marne. It flows westwards through the towns of Montmirail, Villeneuve-sur-Bellot, Saint-Cyr-sur-Morin and Jouarre, finally flowing into the Marne in La Ferté-sous-Jouarre.

References

Rivers of France
Rivers of Grand Est
Rivers of Hauts-de-France
Rivers of Île-de-France
Rivers of Marne (department)
Rivers of Aisne
Rivers of Seine-et-Marne